|}

The Ballyroan Stakes is a Group 3 flat horse race in Ireland open to horses aged three years or older. It is run at Leopardstown over a distance of 1 mile and 4 furlongs (2,414 metres), and it is scheduled to take place each year in August.

The event was established in 1991, and it was originally classed at Listed level. It was initially contested over 1 mile and 2 furlongs, and it was extended to its present length in 1995. It was promoted to Group 3 status in 2007.

Records
Most successful horse (2 wins):
 Vinnie Roe – 2002, 2003
 Mores Wells – 2007, 2008
 Profound Beauty – 2009, 2010

Leading jockey (7 wins):
 Pat Smullen – Grand Finale (2000), Vinnie Roe (2002, 2003), Profound Beauty (2009, 2010), Sense of Purpose (2011), Galileo's Choice (2012)

Leading trainer (10 wins):
 Dermot Weld – Gordi (1997), Grand Finale (2000), Vinnie Roe (2002, 2003), Profound Beauty (2009, 2010), Sense of Purpose (2011), Galileo's Choice (2012), Eziyra (2018), Tarnawa(2021)

Winners

See also
 Horse racing in Ireland
 List of Irish flat horse races

References
 Racing Post:
 
 galopp-sieger.de – Ballyroan Stakes.
 ifhaonline.org – International Federation of Horseracing Authorities – Ballyroan Stakes (2019).
 pedigreequery.com – Ballyroan Stakes – Leopardstown.

Flat races in Ireland
Open middle distance horse races
Recurring sporting events established in 1991
Leopardstown Racecourse